Douglas County School District is a public school district in Douglas County, Georgia, U.S., based in Douglasville. It serves the communities of Austell, Douglasville, Lithia Springs, Villa Rica, and Winston, Georgia. The Douglas County School District is the seventeenth largest district in Georgia.

The school district's central administrative offices are in Douglas County, where graduates can access their records and transcripts, and where all major decisions about the schools are made.

District Leadership 
Superintendent: Trent North

Chief Academic Officer: Pam Nail

Athletics: James Strong

Financial Services: Greg Denney

Community Relations: Karen Stroud & Portia Lake

Asst. Superintendent of Personnel & Policy: Dr. Michelle Ruble

Asst. Superintendent of District Operations: Kwame Carr

Human Resources: Jill De Priest

Procurement: Becky Eigel

Nutrition Services: Danielle Scott-Freeman

Student Services: Renee Davis

Technology: Todd Hindmon

Transportation: E.W Hindman

Board of Education
The board of education consists of five members representing areas of the county. The members are elected at large and serve a term of four years. The board of education meets twice monthly, except during January and July, on the first and third Tuesdays. Current members include:

Members 

Tracy Rookard-Chair/District 3

Michelle Simmons-Vice Chair/District 4

Devetrion Caldwell-District 1

D.T. Jackson-District 2

Jeff Morris- District 5

Schools
, the Douglas County School District has twenty elementary schools, eight middle schools, and five high schools.

Elementary schools 
Annette Winn Elementary School
Arbor Station Elementary School
Beulah Elementary School
Bill Arp Elementary School
Bright Star Elementary School
Burnett Elementary School
Chapel Hill Elementary School
Dorsett Shoals Elementary School
Eastside Elementary School
Factory Shoals Elementary School
Holly Springs Elementary School
Lithia Springs Elementary School
Mason Creek Elementary School
Mirror Lake Elementary School
Mt. Carmel Elementary School
New Manchester Elementary School
North Douglas Elementary School
South Douglas Elementary School
Sweetwater Elementary School
Winston Elementary School

Middle schools
Chapel Hill Middle School
Chestnut Log Middle School
Factory Shoals Middle School
Fairplay Middle School
Mason Creek Middle School
Stewart Middle School
Turner Middle School
Yeager Middle School

High schools 
Alexander High School
Chapel Hill High School
Douglas County High School
Lithia Springs High School
New Manchester High School

Other 
 Brighten Academy
 College & Career Institute 
 Academy at CCI
 Performance Learning System (PLC)
 Virtual Academy

Specific schools

South Douglas Elementary School
The school is located in a community named Fairplay.  The principal is Mr. Duffey and the school has a total of 538 students in grades Pre-K through 5th. The new South Douglas building was built in 1992. This was the first school in Douglas County to start an after-school program and the first to use the Reading First Program.

The colors for the school are red and white and the mascot is the Bear Cub.

Chapel Hill Middle School 
Chapel Hill Middle School is located on Chapel Hill Rd. The school has been named as one of the top middle schools in Georgia. The school colors are purple and gold. The mascot is the wildcat. The school has been named a "Lighthouse School to Watch". Chapel Hill has advanced/gifted classes.

Administrators 

Principal: Jolene Morris

Assistant Principal: Amy Ludlow

Assistant Principal: Cindy Allen

Assistant Principal: Jamar Graham

Douglas County High School
This was the first high school to open in Douglas County, built in the early 1880s. Most of the school was rebuilt due to a fire in the early 1990s, reopening in 1992. It has over 2000 students and offers over 40 clubs, extracurricular activities, and sports. The school offers the International Baccalaureate Program and a graphic arts program.

The school's teams are the Douglas County Tigers, which compete in the Georgia High School Association AAAAAA classification. The school fields teams in baseball, basketball, cheerleading, cross country, fast-pitch softball, football, golf, soccer, swimming, tennis, track and field, volleyball, and wrestling.

The school's colors are navy blue and gold.

Administration:
Andre Weaver, Principal
Tosha Wright, Assistant Principal
Grant Fossum, Assistant Principal

Current Mascot:
Tiger

Alexander High School
Built to relieve overpopulation between Douglas County High School and Lithia Springs High School, Alexander High School opened for the 1986–1987 school year. The school's namesake, Robert S. Alexander, was an employee of the Douglas County School System.

Alexander High School teams are known as the Alexander Cougars and compete in the Georgia High School Association AAAA classification. The school fields teams in baseball, basketball, cheerleading, cross country, fast-pitch softball, football, golf, soccer, swimming, tennis, track and field, volleyball, and wrestling.

The school's colors are red and black.

Lithia Springs High School
Lithia Springs High School is a public high school located on East County Line Road, in Lithia Springs. It is also known as Lithia Springs Comprehensive High School. It was the second high school to open in the Douglas County School District. Until December 2, 1975, the county had only one high school, Douglas County High School, which had opened in the late 1880s. By 1974 the secondary school population had grown to over 3,000 students, far too many for the existing buildings of DCHS to accommodate in a regular school day. Beginning in August 1974, the county had to resort to double sessions. This meant that those students designated to attend Lithia Springs HS would attend the afternoon session, starting at about 11:00 and going until about 5:30. Construction and weather problems delayed the grand opening of LSHS until December, 1975.

References

External links
Douglas County School District

School districts in Georgia (U.S. state)
Education in Douglas County, Georgia